John Wald Jr. was an Australian rules footballer who was the inaugural captain and coach of the Port Adelaide Football Club.

Early life 
Born in Scotland, he was brought to Australia by his parents. His father, John Firth Wald, ran a jewellery and watchmaking business in Adelaide.

Port Adelaide 
Wald captained and coached the Port Adelaide Football Club during its first ever game, which took place in 1870 at Buck's Flat, part of John Hart's Glanville Estate, against a team known as the 'Young Australians'. The game ended in a draw.

Wald played his final match on 1 October 1870, playing for a Port Adelaide "Blue" side against a "White", Wald kicked the only goal of the game and was considered one of the best players in the match.

References

Port Adelaide Football Club (SANFL) players
Port Adelaide Football Club players (all competitions)
Scottish emigrants to Australia
1851 births
1871 deaths
Scottish players of Australian rules football